The women's road race at the 2005 UCI Juniors World Championships cycling event took place on 14 August in Salzburg, Austria. The race was 70.00 km long. 82 cyclists participated in the race and 75 finished.

Final classification (top 10) 

Results from cyclingarchives.com

References 

Women's Road Race
Cycle races in Austria
UCI Road World Championships – Women's road race
2005 in women's road cycling